This is a list of notable Jewish actors. Some of these may have had some Jewish ancestry, and are ethnically considered Jewish, but did not practice Judaism. (e.g. Douglas Fairbanks).

Born in the 1990s–2000s

Born in the 1980s

Born in the 1970s

Born in the 1960s

Born in the 1950s

Born in the 1940s

Born in the 1930s

Born in the 1920s

Born in the 1910s

Born in the 1900s

Born in the 1890s

Born in the 1880s

Born in the mid-19th century

References

Jewish actors
Jewish actors
Actors
Jewish